The Secret of Castle Ronay is a 1922 German silent film directed by Erik Lund and starring Bruno Kastner.

The film's art direction was by Julian Ballenstedt.

References

Bibliography
 Hans-Michael Bock and Tim Bergfelder. The Concise Cinegraph: An Encyclopedia of German Cinema. Berghahn Books.

External links

1922 films
Films of the Weimar Republic
German silent feature films
Films directed by Erik Lund
German black-and-white films
1920s German films